Štvanice is an island on the Vltava river in Czechia, between the Prague districts of Holešovice and Karlín. At the end of the 17th century, a wooden arena was built there. Until 1816, the island was used for dog hunts involving various animals such as bears, bulls, deer, and cows, although these were repeatedly banned. This is the origin of the island's name, which translates to hunt or chase.

In 1931, Štvanice Stadium was built on the island and originally consisted entirely of [wood. This later became the ice skating centre of Prague, until its demolition in 2011. Ice Hockey World Championships were held at the stadium four times: in 1933, 1938, 1947, and 1959. It was here that in 1947, the Czechoslovakia men's national ice hockey team won the world championship for the first time.

In 1986, a modern tennis arena was built on Štvanice, with nine outdoor and two indoor courts. The central court has a capacity of 8,000 seats and is the annual site of the ATP and WTA Prague Open tournaments.

The island also has a roofed skatepark and as such, it is the only place wthat allows year-round skateboarding in Prague. In 2006, a neighbouring indoor skate bowl was added to the facility. In the eastern part of the island, there used to be a public swimming pool, which in the 1990s had a nudist resort. This was of interest for being set up almost directly in the centre of Prague, near a hydropower plant and an adjustable water slalom track. The island is spanned by the Hlávkův bridge and Negrelli viaduct.

Gallery

References

External links

 Štvanice island at Prague.net

Islands of the Czech Republic
Vltava
River islands of the Czech Republic